Judge Bastian may refer to:

Stanley Bastian (born 1958), district judge of the United States District Court for the Eastern District of Washington
Walter M. Bastian (1891–1975), judge of the United States Court of Appeals for the District of Columbia Circuit